The following timeline tables list the discoveries and inventions in the history of electrical and electronic engineering.

History of discoveries timeline

History of associated inventions timeline

List of IEEE Milestones
The following list of the Institute of Electrical and Electronics Engineers (IEEE) milestones represent key historical achievements in electrical and electronic engineering.

Prior to 1870
1745–1746 – Leyden jar capacitor by Ewald Georg von Kleist and Pieter van Musschenbroek
 1751 – Book Experiments and Observations on Electricity by Benjamin Franklin
 1757–1775 – Benjamin Franklin's Work in London
 1799 – Alessandro Volta's Electrical Battery Invention
 1836 – Nicholas Callan's Pioneering Contributions to Electrical Science and Technology
 1828–1837 – Pavel Schilling's Pioneering Contribution to Practical Telegraphy
 1838 – Demonstration of Practical Telegraphy
 1852 – Electric Fire alarm system
 1857 – Heinrich Geissler discovered the first gas discharge tubes in the world a predecessor of today's neon lighting  – Geissler tube
 1861–1870 – Maxwell's equations
 1861 – Transcontinental Telegraph
 1866 – Landing of the Transatlantic Cable
 1866 – County Kerry Transatlantic Cable Stations

1871–1890
 1876 – First Intelligible Voice Transmission over Electric Wire
 1876 – First Distant Speech Transmission in Canada
 1876 – Thomas Alva Edison Historic Site at Menlo Park
 1878 – Ganz Company starts working with single phase AC power systems in Budapest, Austro-Hungary
 1882 – Vulcan Street Plant
 1882 – Pearl Street Station
 1882 – First Central Station in South Carolina
 1883 – Gaulard–Gibbs AC distribution system was published in Great Britain
 1884 – First AIEE Technical Meeting
 1884 – First AC power transmission system (Gaulard–Gibbs) in the world from Lanzo to Turino, Italy
 1885 – ZBD system AC transformer was invented by three Hungarian engineers: Károly Zipernowsky, Ottó Bláthy, Miksa Déri
 1885 – Galileo Ferraris conceives the idea of the first polyphase AC motor
 1885 – Elihu Thomson at Thomson-Houston started the first company in the USA to work on AC
 1886 – Buffalo, New York receives the first commercial AC power system in the USA designed by George Westinghouse, William Stanley, and Oliver B. Shallenberger.
 1886 – Great Barrington, Massachusetts, the first full (community) AC power system in the world  demonstrated by William Stanley, Jr.
 1886 – First Generation and Experimental Proof of Electromagnetic Waves
 1887 – Charles S. Bradley builds the first AC 3 phase generator in US
 1887 – Friedrich August Haselwander builds the first AC 3 phase generator in Europe
 1887 – Thomas A. Edison West Orange Laboratories and Factories
 1887 – Weston Meters, first portable current and voltage meters
 1888 – Richmond Union Passenger Railway
 1889 – Power System of Boston's Rapid Transit
 1890 – Discovery of Radioconduction with a Coherer by Édouard Branly
 1890 – Keage Power Station, Japan's First Commercial Hydroelectric Plant

1891–1900
 1891 – First three phase AC hydro power plant in the world, Lauffen am Neckar, Frankfurt, Germany
 1891 – International Electrotechnical Exhibition powered 3-phase from Lauffen am Neckar 175 km away
 1891 – Ames Hydroelectric Generating Plant
 1893 – Birth and Growth of Battery Industries in Japan
 1893 – Mill Creek No. 1 Hydroelectric Plant
 1894 – Millimeter-wave Communication Experiments by Jagadish Chandra Bose
 1895 – Popov's Contribution to the Development of Wireless Communication
 1895 – Adams Hydroelectric Generating Plant
 1895 – Krka-Šibenik Electric Power System
 1895 – Guglielmo Marconi's Experiments in Wireless Telegraphy
 1895 – Electrification by Baltimore and Ohio Railroad
 1897 – Early Swiss Wireless Experiments that sent a signal over one and a half kilometers. 
 1897 – Chivilingo Hydroelectric Plant
 1898 – Decew Falls Hydro-Electric Plant
 1898 – Rheinfelden Hydroelectric Power Plant
 1899 – First Operational Use Of Wireless Telegraphy in the Anglo-Boer War
 1900 – Georgetown Steam Hydro Generating Plant

1901–1920
 1901 – Transmission of Transatlantic Radio Signals
 1901 – Reception of Transatlantic Radio Signals
 1901 – Early Developments in Remote-Control by Leonardo Torres-Quevedo
 1902 – Poulsen-Arc Radio Transmitter
 1903 – Vucje Hydroelectric Plant
 1904 – Alexanderson Radio Alternator
 1904 – Fleming Valve
 1906 – Pinawa Hydroelectric Power Project
 1906 – First Wireless Radio Broadcast by Reginald A. Fessenden
 1906 – Grand Central Terminal Electrification
 1907 – Alternating-Current Electrification of the New York, New Haven & Hartford Railroad
 1909 – Shoshone Transmission Line
 1911 – Discovery of superconductivity
 1914 – Panama Canal Electrical and Control Installations
 1920 – Westinghouse Radio Station KDKA (AM)
 1920 – Funkerberg Königs Wusterhausen first radio broadcast in Germany

1921–1930
 1924 – Directive shortwave antenna (Yagi–Uda antenna)
 1924 – Enrico Fermi's major contribution to semiconductor statistics
 1924–1941 – Development of electronic television
 1925 – Bell Telephone Laboratories
 1928 – One-way police radio communication
 1929 – Shannon Scheme for the electrification of the Irish Free State
 1929 – Yosami Radio Transmitting Station
 1929 – Largest private (DC) generating plant in the U.S.A.
 1929 – First blind takeoff, flight and landing

1931–1950
 1931–1945 – Development of Ferrite Materials and their applications
 1931 – Invention of Stereo Sound Reproduction
 1932 – First Breaking of Enigma Code by the Team of Polish Cipher Bureau
 1933 – Two-Way Police Radio Communication
 1934 – Long-Range Shortwave Voice Transmissions from Byrd's Antarctic Expedition
 1937 – Westinghouse Atom Smasher
 1938 – Zenit Parabolic Reflector L-Band Pulsed Radar
 1939 – Atanasoff–Berry Computer
 1939 – Claude Shannon, development of Information Theory
 1939 – Single-element Unidirectional Microphone – Shure Unidyne
 1940 – FM Police Radio Communication
 1941 – Opana Radar Site
 1939–1945 – Code-breaking at Bletchley Park during World War II
 1940–1945 – MIT Radiation Laboratory
 1942–1945 – US Naval Computing Machine Laboratory
 1945 – Merrill Wheel-Balancing System
 1945 – Rincón del Bonete Plant and Transmission System
 1946 – Electronic Numerical Integrator and Computer (ENIAC)
 1947 – Invention of the First Transistor at Bell Telephone Laboratories, Inc.
 1947 – Invention of Holography
 1948 – Birth of the Barcode
 1948 – Junction transistor at Bell Labs
 1950 – First External Cardiac Pacemaker

1951–1960
 1951 – Manufacture of Transistors
 1951 – Experimental Breeder Reactor I
 1946–1953 – Monochrome-Compatible Electronic Color Television
 1954 – HVDC Gotland, the first fully commercial static plant for high-voltage direct current transmission (HVDC)
 1955 – WEIZAC Computer
 1956 – RAMAC
 1956 – Ampex Videotape Recorder
 1956 – The First Submarine Transatlantic Telephone Cable System (TAT-1)
 1957–1958 – First Wearable Cardiac Pacemaker
 1958 – First Semiconductor Integrated Circuit (IC) by Jack Kilby
 1959 – Semiconductor planar process by Jean Hoerni and silicon integrated circuit by Robert Noyce
 1959 – MOSFET (metal–oxide–semiconductor field-effect transistor), also known as the MOS transistor, by Mohamed Atalla and Dawon Kahng at Bell Labs
 1959 – Commercialization and industrialization of photovoltaic cells by Sharp Corporation

1961–1970
 1961–1984 – IBM Thomas J. Watson Research Center
 1961–1964 – First Optical Fiber Laser and Amplifier
 1962 – Mercury spacecraft MA-6, Col. John Glenn piloted the Mercury Friendship 7 spacecraft in the first FAI-legal completed human-orbital flight on 20 February 1962.
 1962 – Stanford Linear Accelerator Center
 1962 – First Transatlantic Transmission of a Television Signal via Satellite
 1962 – First Transatlantic Television Signal via Satellite
 1962 – First Transatlantic Reception of a Television Signal via Satellite
 1962 – Alouette-ISIS Satellite Program
 1962–1967 – Pioneering Work on the Quartz Electronic Wristwatch at Centre Electronique Horloger, Switzerland
 1963 – NAIC/Arecibo Radiotelescope
 1963 – First Transpacific Reception of a Television (TV) Signal via Satellite
 1963 – Taum Sauk Pumped-Storage Electric Power Plant
 1963 – ASCII
 1964 – Mount Fuji Radar System
 1964 – Tokaido Shinkansen (Bullet Train)
 1964 – High-definition television
 1964 – TPC-1 Transpacific Cable System
 1964–1973 – Pioneering Work on Electronic Calculators by Sharp Corporation
 1965 – First 735 kV AC Transmission System
 1965 – Dadda multiplier
 1965–1971 – Railroad Ticketing Examining System (developed by OMRON of Japan)
 1966 – Interactive Video Games
 1966 – Shakey, the first mobile robot to be able to reason about its own actions
 1966 – First online search system Dialog, originally developed in Lockheed Martin, now owned by ProQuest
 1967 – First Astronomical Observations Using Very Long Baseline Interferometry
 1968 – Liquid-crystal display by George H. Heilmeier
 1968 – CERN Experimental Instrumentation
 1969 – Birth of the Internet
 1969 – Inception of the ARPANET
 1950–1969 – Electronic Technology for Space Rocket Launches
 1969 – First commercially available Electronic Quartz Wristwatch
 1970 – SPICE Circuit Simulation Program

1971–1999
 1971–1978 – The First Word Processor for the Japanese Language
 1972 – Nelson River HVDC Transmission System
 1972 – Development of the HP-35, the First Handheld Scientific Calculator
 1974 – Birth of CP/M Operating System
 1975 – Gapless Metal Oxide Surge Arrester (MOSA) for electric power systems
 1975 – Line Spectrum Pair (LSP) for high-compression speech coding (developed by NTT)
 1976 – Development of VHS, a World Standard for Home Video Recording
 1976 – Introduction of the Apple I Computer
 1977 – Introduction of the Apple II Computer
 1977 – Lempel–Ziv Data Compression Algorithm
 1977 – Vapor-phase Axial Deposition Method for Mass Production of High-quality Optical Fiber
 1978 – Digital Image from Synthetic Aperture Radar
 1978 – Speak & Spell, the First Use of a Digital Signal Processing IC for Speech Generation
 1979 – Compact Disc Audio Player
 1979 – 20-inch Diameter Photomultiplier Tubes
 1980 – International Standardization of Group 3 Facsimile
 1980 – RISC (Reduced Instruction-Set Computing) Microprocessor
 1981 – 16-Bit Monolithic Digital-to-analog converter (DAC) for Digital Audio
 1981 – Map-Based Automotive Navigation System
 1984 – First Direct-broadcast satellite Service
 1984 – The MU (Middle and Upper atmosphere) radar
 1985 – Toshiba T1100, for Contribution to the Development of Laptop PCs
 1985 – Emergency Warning Code Signal Broadcasting System
 1987 – High Temperature Superconductor
 1987 – SPARC RISC Architecture
 1988 – Sharp 14-Inch Thin Film Transistor Liquid-Crystal Display (TFT-LCD) for TV
 1988 – Solid State High Voltage DC Converter Station
 1988 – Trans-Atlantic Telephone Fiber-optic Submarine Cable, TAT-8
 1988 – Virginia Smith High-Voltage Direct-Current Converter Station
 1989 – Development of CDMA for Cellular Communications

Innovations in consumer electronics

1843–1923: From electromechanics to electronics 

 1843: Watchmaker Alexander Bain (inventor) develops the basic concept of displaying images as points with different brightness values.
 1848: Frederick Collier Bakewell invents the first wirephoto machine, an early fax machine
 1861: Grade school teacher Philipp Reis presents his telephone in Frankfurt, inventing the loudspeaker as a by-product.
 1867: French poet and philosopher Charles Cros (1842–1888) presents the construction principle of a phonograph in his 'paréophone', which turned out not to be a commercial success at the time.
 1867: James Clerk Maxwell (1831–1879) develops a theory predicting the existence of electromagnetic waves and establishes Maxwell's equations to describe their properties. Together with the Lorentz force law, these equations form the foundation for classical electrodynamics and classical optics as well as electric circuits.
 1874: Ferdinand Braun discovers the rectifier effect in metal sulfides and metal oxides.
 1877: Thomas Edison (1847–1931) invents the first phonograph, using a tin foil cylinder. For the first time sounds could be recorded and played. A phonograph horn with membrane and needle was arranged in such a way that the needle had contact to the tinfoil.
 1880: the American physicist Charles Sumner Tainter discovers that many disadvantages of Edison's cylinders can be eliminated if the soundtrack is arranged in spiral form and engraved in a flat, round disk. Technical problems soon ended these experiments. Still, Tainter is regarded as the inventor of the gramophone record.
 1884: Paul Nipkow obtains a patent for his Nipkow disk, an image scanning device that reads images serially, which constitutes the foundation for mechanical television. Two years later his patent runs out.
 1886: Heinrich Hertz succeeds in proving the existence of electromagnetic waves for the first time – now the groundwork for wireless telegraphy and radio broadcasting in physical science is laid.
 1887: Unaware of Charles Sumner Tainter's experiments, German-American Emil Berliner has his phonograph patented. He used a disk instead of a cylinder, primarily to avoid infringing on Edison's patent. Quickly it becomes obvious that flat Gramophone records are easier to duplicate and store. 
 1888:
 Alexander Graham Bell (1847–1922) significantly reduces interfering noises by using a wax cylinder instead of tin foil. This paves the way to commercial success for the improved phonograph.
 American Oberlin Smith describes a process to record audio using a cotton thread with integrated fine wire clippings. This makes reel-to-reel audio tape recording possible.
 1890:
 The phonograph becomes faster and more convenient due to an electric motor. The electric motor brings on the first juke box with cylinders – even before flat disk records were widely available.
 Thomas Edison discovers thermionic emission. This effect forms the basis for the vacuum tube and the cathode ray tube.
 approximately 1893: The invention of the selenium phototube allows the conversion of brightness values into electrical signals. The principle is applied in wirephoto and television technology for a short time. Selenium is used in light meters for the next 50 years.

 1895: Auguste Lumiere's cinematograph displays moving images for the first time. In the same year, brothers Emil and Max Skladanowsky present their "Bioscop" in Berlin.
 1897
 Ferdinand Braun invents the "inertialess cathode ray oscillograph tube", a principle which remained unchanged in television picture tubes.
 The Italian Guglielmo Marconi transmits wireless telegraph messages by electromagnetic waves over a distance of five kilometers.
 1898
 The Danish physicist Valdemar Poulsen creates the world's first magnetic recording and reproduction, using a 1 mm thick steel wire as a magnetizable carrier.
 Nikola Tesla publicly demonstrated the first wireless remote control of a model ship.
 1899: The dog "Nipper" is used in "His Master's Voice", the trademark for gramophones and records.
1901
 The Spanish engineer Leonardo Torres-Quevedo began the development of a system, which he called Telekine, who consisted of a robot that executed commands transmitted by electromagnetic waves. The system was a way of testing dirigible balloons of his own creation without risking human lives. Unlike previous radio controls which carried out actions of the 'on/off' type, Torres defined a method for controlling any mechanical or electrical device with different states of operation. The machine could send up to 19 different orders and it was able to memorize the signals received to carry out operations on its own. In 1906, in the presence of the King of Spain and before a great crowd, Torres successfully demonstrated the invention in the port of Bilbao, guiding a boat from the shore with people on board. With the Telekine, Torres-Quevedo laid down modern wireless remote-control operation principles.
 1902
 Otto von Bronk patented his "Method and apparatus for remote visualization of images and objects with temporary resolution of the images in parallel rows of dots". This patent, originally developed for phototelegraphy, impacted the development of color television, particularly the NTSC implementation.
 For the first time audio records are printed with paper labels in the middle.
 1903: Guglielmo Marconi provides evidence that wireless telegraphic communication is possible over long distances, such as across the Atlantic. He used a transmitter developed by Ferdinand Braun.
 1904
 For the first time, double-sided records, and those with a diameter of 30 cm are produced, increasing playing time up to 11 minutes (5.5 minutes per side). These are created by Odeon in Berlin and debuted at the Leipzig Spring Fair.
 The German physicist Arthur Korn developed the first practical method for telegraphy.
 1905: The Englishman Sir John Ambrose Fleming invents the first electron tube.
 1906
 Robert von Lieben patented his "inertia working cathode-ray-relays". By 1910 he developed this into the first real tube amplifier, by creating a triode. His invention of the triode is almost simultaneously created by the American Lee de Forest.
 Max Dieckmann and Gustav Glage use the Braun tube for playback of 20-line black-and-white images.
 The first jukebox with records comes on the market.
 American Brigadier General Henry Harrison Chase Dunwoody files for a patent for a carborundum steel detector for use in a crystal radio, an improved version of the Cat's-whisker detector. It is sometimes credited as the first semiconductor in history.  The envelope detector is an important part of every radio receiver.   
 1907: Rosenthal puts in his image telegraph for the first time a photocell.
 1911: First film studios are created in Hollywood and Potsdam- Babelsberg .
 1912: The first radio receiver is created, in accordance with the Audion principle.
 1913: The legal battle over the invention of the electron tube between Robert von Lieben and Lee de Forest is decided. The electron tube is replaced by a high vacuum in the glass flask with significantly improved properties.
 Alexander Meissner patented his process "feedback for generating oscillations", by his development of a radio station using an electron tube .
 The Englishman Arthur Berry submits a patent on the manufacture of printed circuits by etched metal.
 1915: Carl Benedicks leads basic studies in Sweden on the electrical properties of silicon and germanium. Due to the emerging tube technology, however, interest in semiconductors remains low until after the Second World War.
 1917
 Based on previous findings of the Englishman Oliver Lodge, the Frenchman Lucien Levy develops a radio receiver with frequency tuning using a resonant circuit.
 1919: Charlie Chaplin founds the Hollywood film production and distribution company United Artists
 1920: The first regularly operating radio station KDKA goes on air on 2 November 1920 in Philadelphia, USA. It is the first time electronics are used to transmit information and entertainment to the public at large. The same year in Germany an instrumental concert was broadcast on the radio from a long-wave transmitter in Wusterhausen.
 1922: J. McWilliams Stone invents the first portable radio receiver. George Frost builds the first "car radio" in his Ford Model T.
 1923
 The 15-year-old Manfred von Ardenne is granted his first patent for an electron tube having a plurality of electrodes. Siegmund Loewe (1885–1962) builds with the tube his first radio receiver "Loewe Opta-".
 The Hungarian engineer Dénes Mihály patented an image scanning with line deflection, in which each point of an image is scanned ten times per second by a selenium cell.
 August Karolus (1893–1972) invents the Kerr cell, an almost inertia-free conversion of electrical pulses into light signals. He was granted a patent for his method of transmitting slides.
 Vladimir Kosma developed the first television camera tube, the Ikonoskop, using the Braun tube.
 The German State Secretary Karl August Bredow founds the first German broadcasting organization. By lifting the ban on broadcast reception and the opening of the first private radio station, the development of radio as a mass medium begins.

1924–1959: From cathode ray tube to stereo audio and TV 
 1924: the first radio receivers are exhibited at the Berlin Radio Show
 1925
 Brunswick Records in Dubuque, Iowa produced their first record player, the Brunswick Panatrope with a pickup, amplifier and loudspeaker
 In the American Bell Laboratories, a method for recording of records obtained by microphone and tube amps for series production. Also in Germany working on it is ongoing since 1922. 1925 appear the first electrically recorded disks in both countries.
 At the Leipzig Spring Fair, the first miniature camera "Leica" is presented to the public.
 John Logie Baird performs the first screening of a living head with a resolution of 30 vertical lines using a Nipkow disk.
 August Karolus demonstrated in Germany television with 48 lines and ten image changes per second.
 1926
 Edison developed the first "LP". By dense grooves (16 grooves on 1 mm) and the reduction of speed to 80 min −1 (later 78 min −1) increases the playing time up to 2 times 20 minutes. He carries himself with the decline of his phonograph business.
 The German State Railroad offers a cordless telephone service in moving trains between Berlin and Hamburg – the idea of mobile telephony is born.
 John Logie Baird developed the first commercial television set in the world. It was not until 1930, he is called a " telescreen sold "at a price of 20 pounds.
 1927
 The first fully electronic music boxes ("Jukeboxes") used in the USA on the market.
 German Grammophon on sale due to a license agreement with the Brunswick-Balke-Collender Company. Its first fully electronic turntables.
 The first industrially manufactured car radio, the "Philco Transitone" from the "Storage Battery Co." in Philadelphia, USA, comes on the market.
 The first shortwave radio – Rundfunkübertragung overseas broadcast by the station PCJJ the Philips factories in Eindhoven in the Dutch colonies.
 Opening of the first regular telegraphy -Dienstes between Berlin and Vienna.
 First commercial sound films ("The Jazz Singer", USA) using the "Needle sound" back in sync with the film screening for LPs over loudspeakers.
 First public television broadcasts in the UK by John Logie Baird between London and Glasgow and in the USA by Frederic Eugene Ives (1882–1953) between Washington and New York.
 The American inventor Philo Taylor Farnsworth (1906–1971) developed in Los Angeles, the first fully electronic television system in the world.
 John Logie Baird developed his Phonovision, the first videodisc player. 30-line television images are stored on shellac records. At 78 RPM mechanically scanned, the images can be played back on his "telescreen". It could not play sound nor keep up with the rapidly increasing resolution of television. More than 40 years later, commercial optical disc players came onto the market.
 1928: Fritz Pfleumer got the first tape recorder patent. It replaces steel wire with paper coated in iron powder. According to Valdemar Poulsen (1898) to the second crucial pioneer of magnetic sound, image and data storage
 Dénes Mihály presented in Berlin a small circle, the first authentic television broadcast in Germany, having worked at least since 1923 in this field.
 August Karolus and the company Telefunken put on the "fifth Great German Radio Exhibition Berlin 1928" the prototype of a television receiver, with an image size of 8 cm × 10 cm and a resolution of about 10,000 pixels, a much better picture quality than previous devices.
 In New York (USA) the first regular television broadcasts of the experiment station WGY, operated by the General Electric Company (GE). Sporadic television news and dramas radiate from these stations by 1928.
 The first commercially produced television receiver of the Daven Corporation in Newark is offered for $75.
 John Logie Baird transmits the first television pictures internationally, and the same across the Atlantic from London to New York. He also demonstrated the world's first color television transmission in London.
 1929
 Edison withdraws from the phono business – the disk has ousted the cylinder.
 The company Columbia Records developed the first portable record player that can be connected to any tube radio. It also created the first radio / phonograph combinations, the precursor to the 1960s music chests.

 The German physicist Curt Stille (1873–1957) records magnetic sound for film, on a perforated steel band. First, this "Magnettonverfahren" has no success. Years later it is rediscovered for amateur films, providing easy dubbing. A "Daylygraph" or Magnettongerät had amplifier and equalizer, and a mature Magnettondiktiergerät called "Textophon".
 Based on patents, which he had purchased of silence, brings the Englishman E. Blattner the " Blattnerphone "the first magnetic sound recording on the market. It records on a thin steel band.
 The first sound film using optical sound premiers. Since the early 1920s, various people have developed this method. The same optoelectronic method also allows for the first time the post-processing of recorded music to sound recordings of it.
 The director Carl Froelich (1875–1953) turns "The Night Belongs to Us", the first German sound film.
 20th Century Fox presents in New York on an 8 m × 4 m big screen the first widescreen movie.
 The radio station Witzleben begins in Germany with the regular broadcasting of television test broadcasts, initially on long wave with 30 lines (= 1,200 pixels) at 12.5 image changes per second. It appear first blueprints for television receiver.
 John Logie Baird starts in the UK on behalf of the BBC with regular experimental television broadcasts to the public.
 Frederic Eugene Ives transmits a color television from New York to Washington.
 1930
 Manfred von Ardenne invented and developed the flying-spot scanner, Europe's first fully electronic television camera tube.  
 In Britain, the first television advertising and the first TV interview 
 1931
 The British engineer and inventor Alan Dower Blumlein (1903–1942) invents "Binaural Sound", today called "Stereo". He developed the stereo record and the first three-way speaker. He makes experimental films with stereo sound. Then he becomes leader of the development team for the EMI-405-line television system.  
 The company RCA Victor presents to the public the first real LP record, the 35 cm diameter and 33.33 RPM give sufficient playing time for an entire orchestral work. But the new turntables are initially so expensive that they are only gain broad acceptance after the Second World War – then as vinyl record.
 The French physicist René Barthélemy in Paris broadcasts the first television signal from a radio transmitter rather than by wire. The BBC launches first Tonversuche in the UK.
 Public World Premiere of electronic television – without electro-mechanical components such as the Nipkow disk – on the "eighth Great German Radio Exhibition Berlin 1931 ". Doberitz / Pomerania is the first German location for a tone-TV stations.
 Manfred von Ardenne can be the principle of a color picture tube patent: Narrow strips of phosphors in the three primary colors are closely juxtaposed arranged so that they complement each other with the electron flow to white light. A separate control of the three colors has not yet provided.
 1932
 The company AEG and BASF start for the magnetic tape method of Fritz Pfleumer to care (1928). They develop new devices and tapes, in which celluloid is used instead of paper as a carrier material.
 In Britain, the BBC sends first radio programs time-shifted instead of live.
 The company telephone and radio apparatus factory Ideal AG (today Blaupunkt) provides a car radio using Bowden cables to control it from the steering column.
 1933
 After the Nazi seizure of power in Germany is broadcasting finally a political tool. Systematic censorship is to prevent opposition and spread the "Aryan culture". Series production of the " People's recipient VE 301 "starts.
 Edwin Howard Armstrong demonstrates that frequency-modulated (FM) radio transmissions are less susceptible to interference than amplitude-modulated (AM). However, practical application is long delayed.
 In the USA the first opened drive-in theater.
 1934: First commercial stereo recordings find little favor – the necessary playback devices are still too expensive. The term "High Fidelity" is embossed around this time.
 1935
 AEG and BASF place at the Berlin Radio Show, the tape recorder " Magnetophon K1 "and the appropriate magnetic tapes before. In case of fire in the exhibition hall all four exhibited devices are destroyed.
 In Germany the world's first regular television program operating for about 250 mostly public reception points starts in Berlin and the surrounding area. The mass production of television receivers is – probably due to the high price of 2,500 Reichsmarks – not yet started.
 At the same time, the research institute of the German Post (RPF) begins with development work for a color television methods, but which are later reinstated due to the Second World War.
 1936
 Olympic Games in Berlin broadcast live. 
 "Olympia suitcase", battery-powered portable radio receiver, introduced.
 The first mobile television camera (180 lines, all-electronic) is used for live television broadcasts of the Olympic Games.
 Also in the UK are first regular television broadcasts – now for the perfect electronic EMI system, which soon replaced the mechanical part Baird system – broadcast.
 Video telephony connections between booths in Berlin and Leipzig. Later connections from Berlin to Nuremberg and Munich added.
 The Frenchman Raymond Valtat reports on a patent, which describes the principle of working with binary numbers abacus.
 Konrad Zuse works on a dual electromechanical computing machine that is ready in 1937.
 1937
 First sapphire needle for records of the company Siemens
 The interlaced video method is introduced on TVr to reduce image flicker.  The transmitter Witzleben uses the new standard with 441 lines and 25 image changes, i.e. 50 fields of 220 half-lines.  Until the HDTV era the interlace method remains in use.
 First movie encoder make it possible not to send the TV live, but to rely on recordings.
 1938
 The improved AEG tape-recorder "Magnetophon K4" is first used in radio studios. The belt speed is 77 cm / s, which at 1000 m length of tape has a playing time of 22 minutes.
 Werner Flechsig invents the shadow mask method for separate control of the three primary colors in a color picture tube.
 1939
 On the "16th Great German Radio and television broadcasting exhibition Berlin 1939 ", the" German Unity television receiver E1 "and announces the release of free commercial television. Due to the difficult political and economic situation, only about 50 devices are sold instead of the planned 10,000.
 In the USA the first regular television broadcasts take place.
 1940
 The development of television technology for military purposes increases the resolution to 1029 lines at 25 frames per second. Commercial HDTV television reached that resolution almost half a century later.
 The problem of band noise with tape devices is reduced dramatically by the invention of radio frequency bias of Walter Weber and Hans-Joachim von Braunmühl.
 1942: The first all-electronic computer is used by John Vincent Atanasoff, but quickly fades into oblivion. Four years later the ENIAC completed – the beginning of the end of Electromechanics in computers and calculators.
 1945–1947: American soldiers capture in Germany some tape recorders. This and the nullified German patents leads to the development of the first tape recorders in the United States. The first home device " Sound Mirror "by the Brush Development Co. is there on the market.
 1948
 The American physicist and industrialist Edwin Herbert Land (1909–1991) launches the first instant camera, Polaroid camera Model 95 on the market.
 Three American engineers at Bell Laboratories (John Bardeen, Walter Brattain and William Shockley) invent the transistor.  Its lesser size and power compared with electron tubes brings (from 1955) portable radio receivers starting its march through all areas of electronics.
 The Hungarian-American physicist Peter Carl Goldmark (1906–1977) invents the vinyl record (first published 1952), much less noisy than their predecessors shellac. Thanks to micro-groove (100 grooves per cm) can play 23 minutes per side. The LP record is born. This one is the redemption of the claim "high fidelity one step closer" to the end of the shellac era.
 The Radio Corporation of America (RCA) leads the music format with 45 RPM records, later to conquer the market for cheap players. The first publication in Germany in this format appears 1953rd
 The British physicist Dennis Gabor (1900–1979) invents holography.  This method of recording and reproducing image with coherent light allows three-dimensional images.  It was not until 1971 when the procedure gained practical importance, he received the Nobel Prize for Physics.
 1949
 In Germany, FM broadcasting starts regular program operation.
 Experimentally since 1943, series production since 1949 there are for professional use stereo – Tonbandgeräte and matching ribbons. Also portable devices for reporters, initially propelled by a spring mechanism, has been around since 1949
 1950
 In the USA the first prerecorded audio tapes are marketed.
 Also in the USA the company Zenith markets the first TV with cable remote control for channel selection.
 1951
 The CBS (Columbia Broadcasting System) broadcasts in New York the first color television program in the world, but using the field sequential standard, not reaching to the resolution of the black and white television and was to be incompatible.
 With the " tape recorder F15 "from AEG 's first home tape recorder appears on the German market.
 RCA Electronic Music is the first synthesizer prior to the creation of artificial electronic sounds.
 1952
 Reintroduction of regular television broadcasts in Germany after the Second World War.
 20th Century Fox developed with "Cinemascope" the most successful wide-screen process to better compete with television. Only some 50 years later pulls the TV with the 16: 9 size screen after.
 1953
 The "National Television System Committee" (Abbreviated as NTSC) normalized in the USA named after her black-and-white-compatible NTSC -Farbfernseh process. A year later, this method is introduced in the United States.
 The car radio top model "Mexico" from Becker for the first time to an FM area (in mono) and an automatic tuning.
 1954
 RCA developed for the first apparatus for recording video signals on magnetic tapes. 22 km magnetic tape are needed per hour. By 1956, succeeds the company Ampex through the use of multiple tracks, the tape speed to more practicable 38.1 cm / s lower.
 The European Broadcasting Union is founded "Euro Vision".
 First regular television broadcasts in Japan.
 1955
 The second generation "TRADIC" (Transistorized Digital Computer), first to use only transistors therefore much smaller and more powerful than its predecessor tube computers.
 The Briton Narinder Singh Kapany investigated the propagation of light in fine glass fibers (optical fibers).
 The first wireless remote control for a television US-based Zenith consists of a better flashlight, with which one lights up in one of the four devices corners to turn the unit on or off, change the channel or mute the sound.
 1956
 The company Metz introduces radio device type 409 / 3D.  First mass production of printed circuit boards. This follows since the 1930s, several improvements to the manufacturing technology.
 The company Ampex introduces the "VR 1000" the first video recorder. That same year, CBS uses it for the first  magnetic video tape recording (VTR) from. Although other programs are produced in color since 1954, the VTR cannot record color.
 1957: The Frenchman Henri de France (1911–1986) developed the first generation of color TV system SECAM, which avoids some of the problems of the NTSC method. The weaknesses of the SECAM system be fixed in later modifications of the standard for the most part.
 1958
 By merging the Edison patents and the Berliner, the Blumlein stereo recording method becomes commercially viable. The company Mercury Records launches the first stereo record on the market.
 The company Ampex expands the video recorder with the Model "VR 1000 B" to give it color capability.

See also

 Electronics
 History of electronic engineering
 Timeline of historic inventions
 Timeline of heat engine technology
 Timeline of quantum computing and communication
 Timeline of computing
 Computer History Museum

References

External links
 List of IEEE Milestones

Electrical-engineering-related lists
History of electrical engineering
Milestones
Electrical
Electrical and electronic engineering